"Years & Years" is a song performed by English singer-songwriter Olly Murs. The song was released as a digital download in the United Kingdom on 9 December 2016 as the third single from his fifth studio album 24 Hrs (2016). The song has peaked at number 83 on the UK Singles Chart.

Music video
A music video to accompany the release of "Years & Years" was first released onto YouTube on 16 December 2016 at a total length of three minutes and forty-one seconds.

Track listing
Digital Download (Remixes) - EP
"Years & Years" (Jack Wins Remix Radio Edit) — 2:57
"Years & Years" (Jack Wins Remix Club Edit) — 5:53
"Years & Years" (Nick Talos Remix Radio Edit) — 3:12
"Years & Years" (Nick Talos Remix Club Edit) — 3:45

Charts

Release history

References

2016 songs
Songs written by Steve Mac
Songs written by Wayne Hector
Songs written by Olly Murs
Olly Murs songs
Epic Records singles